Lea is a monotypic genus of true katydids in the family Tettigoniidae containing the species Lea floridensis.

References

Further reading

 

Pseudophyllinae
Tettigoniidae genera
Monotypic Orthoptera genera
Articles created by Qbugbot